"Who Do You Think You Are" is a song written by British songwriting-team Des Dyer and Clive Scott. The song was first recorded by the pop group Candlewick Green and released in late December 1973. The song peaked at #21 in the United Kingdom in February 1974.

Candlewick Green version

Track listings
 7" vinyl - Decca Records
 "Who Do You Think You Are?" (Dyer, Scott)
 "Fingers In Your Ears" (Dyer, Scott)

Charts

Bo Donaldson and the Heywoods version
Bo Donaldson and the Heywoods covered "Who Do You Think You Are" in 1974.  Their version became a hit in both the United States and Canada. It peaked at #15 on the U.S. Billboard Hot 100 and #13 on Cash Box.  It was a bigger hit in Canada, where it reached #11.  It was also an Adult Contemporary hit in both nations.

Track listings
 7" vinyl - ABC Records
 "Who Do You Think You Are?" (Dyer, Scott)
 "Fool's Way Of Lovin'" (Michael Price, Dan Walsh)

Charts

Weekly charts

Year-end charts

Saint Etienne version

British indie dance/indie pop band Saint Etienne released an alternative dance-pop arrangement of "Who Do You Think You Are" on their first compilation album, You Need a Mess of Help to Stand Alone (1993). This version featured Debsey Wykes as co-lead vocalist, sometime backing singing for the band and former singer of Dolly Mixture. It peaked at number 23 on the UK Singles Chart as a double A-side with "Hobart Paving".

Critical reception
Stewart Mason from AllMusic felt that "Who Do You Think You Are" is "one of St. Etienne's most groove-oriented tunes." Larry Flick from Billboard wrote, "English modern-pop act delves into Bo Donaldson & the Heywoods' pop evergreen with fanciful, disco-minded results. Singer Debsey offers a soft, sugar-coated vocal with a pleasant, cushiony house groove resting beneath." He added, "Far more interesting and effective than the group's previous releases." In his weekly UK chart commentary, James Masterton said it's "a completely new track, a superbly crafted bit of pop which should be Top 10 if there is any justice in the world. We shall see." Damon Albarn and Alex James of Blur reviewed the song for Smash Hits, naming it Best New Single and giving it five out of five. Albarn said, "I like the idea of this. I think they are getting a lot better. I think this is their most complete song. I think the radio will almost certainly play this and it will easily be a Top 20 hit. It's wonderful shopping mall music. It's shopping mall music with attitude. That's what it is."

Music video
A music video was produced to promote the single. It was later published on YouTube in May 2012.

Track listings
All tracks written and composed by Dyer and Scott; except where indicated.

 7" - Heavenly Records / HVN 29 (UK) (also available on MC (HVN 29C))
 "Hobart Paving" (Stanley, Wiggs) – 4:54
 "Who Do You Think You Are" – 3:53

 12" - Heavenly Records / HVN 29-12 (UK)
 "Hobart Paving" (Stanley, Wiggs) – 4:54
 "Your Head My Voice (Voix Revirement)" (Stanley, Wiggs) – 4:12
 "Who Do You Think You Are" – 3:53
 "Who Do You Think You Are" (Quex-Rd) – 8:08

 12" - Heavenly Records / HVN 29-12P (UK) (UK promo. Labelled "Aphex Twin Remixes")
 "Who Do You Think You Are" (Quex-Rd) – 8:08
 "Your Head My Voice" (Voix Revirement) (Stanley, Wiggs) – 4:12

 CD - Heavenly Records / HVN 29CD (UK)
 "Hobart Paving" (Stanley, Wiggs) – 4:54
 "Who Do You Think You Are" – 3:53
 "Who Do You Think You Are" (Quex-Rd) – 8:08
 "Your Head My Voice (Voix Revirement)" (Stanley, Wiggs) – 4:12

 12" - Warner Bros. Records / 0-40910 (US)
 "Who Do You Think You Are" (Strobelights & Platform Shoes Mix) – 7:00
 "Who Do You Think You Are" (Saturday Night Fever Dub) – 6:59
 "Who Do You Think You Are" (Tilt Dub) – 6:00
 "Who Do You Think You Are" (Quex-Rd) – 8:08
 "Who Do You Think You Are" (Nu Solution Mix) – 7:46
 "Hobart Paving" (UK single version) (Stanley, Wiggs) – 4:54

 2x12" - Warner Bros. Records / PRO-A-6254 (US) (US 2x12" promo)
 "Who Do You Think You Are" (Strobelights & Platform Shoes Mix) – 7:00
 "Who Do You Think You Are" (Saturday Night Fever Dub) – 6:59
 "Who Do You Think You Are" (Nu Solution Mix) – 7:46
 "Who Do You Think You Are" (Tilt Dub) – 6:00

 "Who Do You Think You Are" (Quex-Rd) – 8:08
 "Your Head My Voice (Voix Revirement)" (Stanley, Wiggs) – 4:12
 "Who Do You Think You Are" (Radio Remix) – 4:39
 "Who Do You Think You Are" (Bonus Beats Down) – 4:55

 CD - Warner Bros. Records / 9 40910-2 (US)
 "Who Do You Think You Are" (Album Version) – 3:52
 "Who Do You Think You Are" (Strobelights & Platform Shoes Mix) – 7:00
 "Who Do You Think You Are" (Quex-Rd) – 8:08
 "Hobart Paving" (UK single version) (Stanley, Wiggs) – 4:54
 "Who Do You Think You Are" (Nu Solution Mix) – 7:46
 "Who Do You Think You Are" (Saturday Night Fever Dub) – 6:59
 "Your Head My Voice (Voix Revirement)" – 4:12
 "Who Do You Think You Are" (Radio Remix) (Stanley, Wiggs) – 4:39

Charts

Other cover versions
 In 1974, Dyer and Scotts's pop group Jigsaw recorded the song as an album track on their 1974 studio album; I've Seen The Film, I've Read The Book.

References

British pop songs
Saint Etienne (band) songs
Bo Donaldson and The Heywoods songs
1973 singles
1974 singles
1993 singles
1973 songs
Decca Records singles
Heavenly Recordings singles
Songs written by Clive Scott